General elections were held in the Faroe Islands on 30 April 2002.

Results

See also
List of members of the Løgting, 2002–04

References

Elections in the Faroe Islands
Faroes
2002 in the Faroe Islands
April 2002 events in Europe